Chaudhry Abdul Razzaq Dhillon is a Pakistani politician who was a Member of the Provincial Assembly of the Punjab, from 2008 to May 2018.

Early life and education
He was born on 11 June 1961 in Sargodha.

He graduated in 1983 from University of the Punjab and has a degree of Bachelor of Arts.

Political career
He ran for the seat of the Provincial Assembly of the Punjab from Constituency PP-33 (Sarghoda-VI) as a candidate of Pakistan Muslim League (N) (PML-N) and from Constituency PP-34 (Sarghoda-VII) in 2002 Pakistani general election but was unsuccessful. He received 15,700 votes from Constituency PP-33 (Sarghoda-VI) and lost the seat to Malik Shoaib Awan, a candidate of Pakistan Peoples Party (PPP), and received 58 votes from Constituency PP-34 (Sarghoda-VII) and lost the seat to Nadia Aziz.

He was elected to the Provincial Assembly of the Punjab as a candidate of PML-N from Constituency PP-33 (Sarghoda-VI) in 2008 Pakistani general election. He received 34,941 votes and defeated Muhammad Afzal Mirza, a candidate of PPP. In the same election, he also ran for the seat of the Provincial Assembly of the Punjab as an independent candidate from Constituency PP-34 (Sarghoda-VII) but was unsuccessful. He received 46 votes and lost the seat to Rizwan Nowaiz Gill, a candidate of PML-N.

He was re-elected to the Provincial Assembly of the Punjab as a candidate of PML-N from Constituency PP-33 (Sarghoda-VI) in 2013 Pakistani general election. He received 58,714 votes and defeated Chaudhry Ali Asif Bagga, a candidate of Pakistan Tehreek-e-Insaf (PTI).

References

Living people
Punjab MPAs 2013–2018
1961 births
Pakistan Muslim League (N) politicians
Punjab MPAs 2008–2013